Hemiphora bartlingii, commonly known as woolly dragon, is a flowering plant in the mint family Lamiaceae and is endemic to the south-west of Western Australia. It is an erect shrub with branches covered with greyish, rusty-coloured hairs, leaves with a blistered appearance and with white, pink or purple flowers over an extended period.

Description
The leaves are linear to lance-shaped, but often appear almost cylindrical because their edges are strongly turned under.

The flowers are surrounded by leafy, linear to lance-shaped, woolly bracts and bracteoles which are densely woolly on the outer surface, less so on the inner side. The outside of the petal tube has a few short hairs but glabrous on the inside except for a narrow ring of hairs around the ovary. The four stamens are shorter than the tube, the lower pair slightly longer than the upper ones.

Taxonomy and naming
This species was first formally described in 1844 by Johann Lehmann and given the name Chloanthes bartlingii. The description was published in Delectus Seminum quae in Horto Hamburgensium botanico e collectione. In 1870 George Bentham changed the name to Pityrodia bartlingii and in 2011, Barry Conn, Murray Henwood and Nicola Streiber changed it to the present name. The specific epithet (bartlingii) honours the German botanist Friedrich Gottlieb Bartling.

Distribution
Woolly dragon mostly occurs to the north of Perth but is found between Busselton and the Murchison River, sometimes as far east as Yellowdine. It grows in sandy kwongan and woodland in the Geraldton Sandplains, Swan Coastal Plain, Avon Wheatbelt, Jarrah Forest and Mallee biogeographic regions.

Conservation
Hemiphora bartlingii is classified as "not threatened" by the Western Australian Government Department of Parks and Wildlife.

References

External links
 
 

bartlingii
Plants described in 1844
Flora of Western Australia
Taxa named by Johann Georg Christian Lehmann